Bocainella minima is a species of beetle in the family Cerambycidae, and the only species in the genus Bocainella. It was described by Monne and Monne in 2008.

References

Parmenini
Beetles described in 2008